Sofia Anker-Kofoed (born 28 November 1994) is a Swedish footballer. She last played as an attacker for FC Rosengård in the Damallsvenskan.

Club career
She plays for FC Rosengård since 2011, winning a Damallsvenskan titles in 2013 and a Super Cup in 2012.

International career
She was part of the Sweden U-19 that won the 2012 UEFA Women's U-19 Championship.

Honours

Club
FC Rosengård
Winner
 Damallsvenskan: 2013
 Super Cup: 2012

Runner-up
 Damallsvenskan: 2012

International
Winner
 UEFA Women's U-19 Championship: 2012

References

External links
 
 
 
 Sofia Anker-Kofoed at Soccerdonna.de 
 Sofia Anker-Kofoed at Fussballtransfers.com 
 

1994 births
Living people
Swedish women's footballers
FC Rosengård players
Damallsvenskan players
Washington State Cougars women's soccer players
Women's association football forwards